Neil Davis (1 August 1900 – 25 April 1974) was an Australian cricketer. He played eleven first-class matches for Tasmania between 1923 and 1936.

See also
 List of Tasmanian representative cricketers

References

External links
 

1900 births
1974 deaths
Australian cricketers
Tasmania cricketers
Cricketers from Launceston, Tasmania